"Party Right" is a single by English Grime artist Lethal Bizzle, featuring vocals from British pop recording artist Ruby Goe. It was released on 25 August 2013 for digital download in the United Kingdom. The song has peaked at number 29 on the UK Singles Chart.

Music video
A music video to accompany the release of "Party Right" was first released onto YouTube on 6 August 2013 at a total length of three minutes and thirty-four seconds.

Track listings

Chart performance

Weekly charts

Release history

References

2013 singles
Lethal Bizzle songs
2013 songs
Songs written by Lethal Bizzle
Songs written by Diztortion